USS Reynolds (DE-42) was an  constructed for the United States Navy during World War II. She was sent off into the Pacific Ocean to protect convoys and other ships from Japanese submarines and fighter aircraft. She performed escort and antisubmarine operations in dangerous battle areas and was awarded eight battle stars, a very high number for a ship of her type.

She was originally assigned to the United Kingdom and was laid down on 12 January 1943 as BDE-42 by the Puget Sound Navy Yard, Bremerton, Washington. she was commissioned on 1 November 1943.

Namesake
Dudley Louis Reynolds was born on 20 November 1910 at Blair, Nebraska. He enlisted in the Navy on 4 January 1928. Warranted Machinist from 18 February 1938, he was commissioned Ensign on 23 July 1942. He was killed on board Pensacola during the Battle of Tassafaronga on 30 November 1942.

World War II Pacific Theatre operations
Following shakedown off southern California, Reynolds departed the West Coast on 13 January 1944 and steamed to Pearl Harbor. Further training followed and on 27 January she sailed west in the screen of  then ferrying replacement aircraft to forward areas. Arriving at Majuro on 4 February, she accompanied White Plains to Kwajalein, then back to Majuro, whence they steamed via Makin to Pearl Harbor, arriving on 23 February. Reynolds then operated under Commander, Submarine Training Force, into May and, after conducting an ASW demonstration for Australian observers, she resumed oceanic escort duties with a run to Eniwetok. Arriving 20 June, she joined TG 12.2, a hunter-killer group, and on 28 July assisted  in sinking .
 
Detached from hunter-killer duty on 9 August, Reynolds returned to Pearl Harbor. Departing again on 20 August as a unit of TU 31.4.4, the Western Garrison Force for the Palau operation, she arrived at Kossol Passage on 20 September and, until 5 October, remained in the area, patrolling the northern entrance to the passage. Between 5 October and 14 November, she escorted ships between Manus and Purvis Bay, then proceeded to Ulithi where she joined TG 30.8 on the 17th. Operating primarily with that group for the remainder of the war, she screened the auxiliaries as they replenished the task groups of TF 38/58 off the Philippines, Formosa, Iwo Jima, and Okinawa.

End-of-War operations
 
After the cessation of Pacific hostilities, Reynolds continued to screen the logistic ships. Detached on 4 September she proceeded to Tokyo Bay. There until the 7th, she screened refueling operations for TF 16, then steamed via Ulithi for the United States and inactivation.

Stateside inactivation and decommissioning 

Arriving at San Francisco, California, in mid-October, Reynolds decommissioned at Mare Island, California, on 5 December 1945. Struck from the Navy List on 19 December 1945, she was sold and delivered to Mr. John L. Key, San Francisco, on 28 April 1947.

Awards

References

External links
 

 

Evarts-class destroyer escorts
Ships built in Bremerton, Washington
1943 ships
World War II frigates and destroyer escorts of the United States